Foxfire Light is a 1982 American romance drama film written by Janet Dailey and directed by Allen Baron. Starring Leslie Nielsen, Tippi Hedren, Faye Grant, Barry Van Dyke, and Lara Parker, it is based on a romantic novel by Janet Dailey, featuring the story of a young woman who starts a romance with a cowboy in the Ozarks.

Plot

Joanna, a recent college graduate, decides to leave her manipulating mother and stay within the Ozarks in order to find herself. What she finds is a small town filled with romance and the promise of love.

Cast

 Leslie Nielsen as Reece Morgan
 Tippi Hedren as Elizabeth Morgan
 Faye Grant as Joanna Morgan
 Barry Van Dyke as Linc Wilder
 Lara Parker as Rachel Parmelee
 John Steadman as Jesse
 Burton Gilliam as Deke
 Mike Coffett as Ezekiah
 Irene Coger as Old Biddy
 Stephen E. Grant as Ted
 Lonnie Hoppers as Banjo Player
 Newell Looney as Fiddle Player
 Ed Marshall as Ned
 Hal Meadows as Airport Cop
 Joe MacFerron as Boy in Car
 Erin McGuire as Waitress
 Nelia Sanders as Tanya
 A.J. Simmons as Ozark Ticket Agent
 Kevin Thomas as Chef
 Michael T. Webb as Ezzard

Reception

References

External links

1982 films
1982 romantic drama films
American romantic drama films
1980s English-language films
1980s American films